Jeremi is a given name. Notable people with the name include:

Jeremi Johnson (born 1980), American football player
Jeremi Kimmakon (born 1994), French footballer
Jeremi Kubicki (1911–1938), Polish painter
Jeremi Mohyła (c. 1555 – 1606), Voivode (Prince) of Moldavia
Jeremi Przybora (1915–2005), Polish poet, writer, actor and singer
Jeremi Suri, American historian
Jeremi Wasiutyński (1907–2005), Polish astronomer and philosopher
Jeremi Wiśniowiecki (1612–1651), member of the aristocracy of the Polish–Lithuanian Commonwealth

See also
Jerami, given name
Jeremie (name), given name and surname
Jeremy (given name)

Polish masculine given names